TRT 3 is a Turkish television channel. It mostly broadcasts sport events.

History 

TRT 3 started test transmissions on October 2, 1989 as "3. Kanal", and is now TRT's third most watched TV station. TRT 3’s transmissions are realized through a time-share with TRT GAP and Turkish Grand National Assembly TV (TBMM TV). TRT 3’s programs mainly consist of sports, education, culture, music and news. Like most TRT channels, advertisements are allowed on this channel. Besides, TRT 3 broadcasts programs in vernaculars and dialects still practiced today in the daily lives of Turkish people.

Between 1991 to 2008 for Turksat Kablo TV viewers, Spanish public broadcaster TVE Internacional will broadcast after close down TRT 3.

On screen identity 

Like other TRT channels, even TRT 3 broadcasts 24 hours. Its broadcast starts with a short startup at 06:58. On this start-up, first the TRT Ident is shown, followed by the programme list for the day and Independence March. TRT 3 aired many world-known series for the first time in Turkey. Among them were Matlock, M*A*S*H, Perry Mason, Hercule Poirot, Night Court, Remington Steele, Automan, Manimal, Loving,  The Golden Girls, Out of This World, Houston Knights, Manuela and Thirtysomething. Furthermore, it re-aired some television series like The Waltons, Little House on the Prairie, Bewitched, Bonanza and Columbo.

HD broadcast 

TRT 3 HD was the first high definition channel of TRT. It launched on 8 August 2008 to air 2008 Summer Olympics and closed on 24 August 2008.

See also 

 List of television stations in Turkey

References

External links 

 Official website 
 TRT 3 Spor Broadcasting Schedule
 Watch TRT 3 Spor/TRT Gap live Online
 TRT 3 at LyngSat Address

Television stations in Turkey
Turkish-language television stations
Television channels and stations established in 1989
1989 establishments in Turkey
Turkish Radio and Television Corporation